The Spanish West Indies or the Spanish Antilles (also known as "Las Antillas Occidentales" or simply "Las Antillas Españolas" in Spanish) were Spanish colonies in the Caribbean. In terms of governance of the Spanish Empire, The Indies was the designation for all its overseas territories and was overseen by the Council of the Indies, founded in 1524 and based in Spain. When the Crown established the Viceroyalty of New Spain in 1535, the islands of the Caribbean came under its jurisdiction. 

The islands ruled by Spain were chiefly the Greater Antilles such as Hispaniola (inclusive of modern-day Haiti and the Dominican Republic), Cuba, Jamaica, and Puerto Rico. The majority of the indigenous populations on these islands had died out or had mixed with the European colonizers by 1520. Spain also claimed the Lesser Antilles (such as Guadalupe and the Cayman Islands) but these smaller islands remained largely independent until they were conquered in the late 17th and early 18th century by other European nations.

The islands that became the Spanish West Indies were the focus of the voyages of the Spanish expedition of Christopher Columbus in America. Largely due to the familiarity that Spaniards gained from Columbus's voyages, the islands were also the first lands to be permanently colonized by Spanish in the Americas. The Spanish West Indies were also the most enduring part of Spain's American Empire, only being surrendered in 1898 at the end of the Spanish–American War. For over three centuries, Spain controlled a network of ports in the Caribbean including Havana (Cuba), San Juan (Puerto Rico), Cartagena de Indias, Veracruz (Mexico), and Portobelo, Panama, which were connected by galleon routes.

Some smaller islands were seized or ceded to other European powers as a result of war, or diplomatic agreements during the 17th and 18th centuries. Others such as Dominican Republic gained their independence in the 19th century.

Change of sovereignty or independence 
 The Bay Islands were ceded to England in 1643 and then to Honduras in 1861.
 Colony of Santiago—Jamaica was captured by England in 1655, confirmed in the Treaty of Madrid (1670).
 The Cayman Islands were ceded to England in the Treaty of Madrid (1670).
 Haiti (western Hispaniola) was ceded to France in the Treaty of Ryswick in 1697 (Saint-Domingue).
 Trinidad was captured by Britain during the invasion of Trinidad, confirmed in the Treaty of Amiens in 1802.
 Captaincy General of Santo Domingo (eastern Hispaniola) was ceded to France during the War of the First Coalition. It would later be returned to Spain, and gained its independence from Spain as Spanish Haiti in 1821, then from Haiti as the Dominican Republic, and again from Spain at the end of the Dominican Restoration War in 1865, when the second Dominican Republic was proclaimed.
 Captaincy General of Cuba was lost to the United States in 1898, after the Spanish–American War concluded by the 1898 Treaty of Paris.
 Captaincy General of Puerto Rico was lost to the United States in 1898, after the Spanish–American War concluded by the 1898 Treaty of Paris.

Spanish Caribbean 

Today, the term Spanish Caribbean or Hispanophone Caribbean refers to the Spanish-speaking areas in the Caribbean Sea, chiefly Cuba, the Dominican Republic, and Puerto Rico. An even broader definition can include the Caribbean coasts of Mexico, Central America (Guatemala, Honduras, Nicaragua, Costa Rica, and Panama), and South America (Colombia and Venezuela), however aside from Panama, Venezuela, and parts of Colombia, most of these countries share little with the Spanish-speaking Caribbean islands culturally. It includes regions where Spanish is the main language, and where the legacy of Spanish settlement and colonization influences culture, through religion, language, cuisine, and so on. The varieties of Spanish that predominate in this region are known collectively as Caribbean Spanish. 

The Spanish Caribbean (Cuba, Dominican Republic, and Puerto Rico) can be considered a separate subregion of Latin America, culturally distinct from both continental Spanish-speaking countries and the non-Spanish -speaking Caribbean. Apart from culture, the Spanish Caribbean is different racially as well. In comparison to the predominantly black majority of the non-Hispanic Caribbean, but with similarities to the multi-racial continental areas of Latin America, mixed-race people are most dominant in this region. However, in the Spanish Caribbean, the majority of the mixed-race population is made up of mulattos/tri-racials, being of mixed white Spanish, black West African, and indigenous Taino ancestry, who also make up the majority of the total population overall, especially in the Dominican Republic, as opposed to mestizos in many continental Hispanic countries. Also, like the majority of the Caribbean, there are still sizeable populations of unmixed black people and a large amount of undeniably African cultural influences. The Spanish Caribbean also has higher Canarian influence compared to continental Latin America, making them the primary European ancestral group. French ancestry is high, due to white French fleeing Haiti after independence to the surrounding Hispanic Caribbean. Around 18% of surnames in the Spanish Caribbean are of French origin, second highest after Spanish. This mixture of European (especially Canarian), West African, and Taino is heavily reflected in the culture.

The term is used in contrast to Anglophone Caribbean, French Caribbean, and Dutch Caribbean, which are other modern linguistic divisions of the Caribbean region. The Hispanophone Caribbean is a part of the wider Hispanic America, which includes all the Spanish-speaking countries in the Americas. Historically, coastal areas of Spanish Florida and the Caribbean South America (cf. the Spanish Main) were closely tied to the Spanish Caribbean. During the period of Spanish settlement and colonization of the New World, the Spanish West Indies referred to those settlements in islands of the Caribbean Sea under political administration of Spain, as in the phrase "a 1765 cedula authorized seven sea ports, in addition to the port of San Juan, to trade with the Spanish Caribbean." Until the early 19th century these territories were part of the Viceroyalty of New Spain.

In a modern sense, the Caribbean islands of Colombia could be included in the Hispanophone Caribbean as well, due to the fact they are located in the Caribbean, but not in the Antilles.

Islands 

Below is a list of islands belonging geographically to the Greater and Lesser Antilles and that were under Spanish rule in various stages of history, until it became independent from Spain. Several islands which were previously largely under Spanish rule, but since they were passed into the domain of France, England or the Netherlands, are no longer considered part of the Spanish Caribbean.

In addition, the Colombian islands of San Andrés, Providencia and Santa Catalina are located in the Caribbean, but are not part of the Antilles. Under intermittent periods of Spanish rule, these islands were administered as part of the Spanish Main (initially Guatemala, later New Granada).

See also 

 Antillean Confederation
 British West Indies
 Danish West Indies
 Dutch West Indies
 French West Indies
 New Spain
 Population history of American indigenous peoples
 Province of Tierra Firme
 Spanish colonization of the Americas
 Spanish East Indies
 Voyages of Christopher Columbus

 Culture of Cuba
 Culture of Dominican Republic
 Culture of Puerto Rico

References

External links 
 "Method of Securing the Ports and Populations of All the Coasts of the Indies" was written in 1694 and discusses the Spanish West Indies

 
Colonial government in the West Indies
Spanish Caribbean
Former colonies in North America
Former countries in the Caribbean
Former Spanish colonies
History of the Caribbean
History of New Spain
Spanish colonization of the Americas
Spanish-speaking countries and territories
Latin America
.West
States and territories established in 1492
States and territories disestablished in 1898
.
.
1492 establishments in North America
1892 disestablishments in North America
West Indies
West Indies